Frederik Alves Ibsen (born 8 November 1999) is a Danish professional footballer who plays as a centre-back for Danish Superliga club Brøndby. Alves also played for Denmark in youth levels, most recently national U21 team.

Club career

Youth career
Due to Alves' Brazilian background, he travelled to visit some family in Brazil. Alves played with his cousins and took part in a few training matches, before he was spotted by an agent, which he made a deal with. The agent then brought 15-year old Alves to Coritiba. Alves returned to Denmark after two years in Brazil and joined Silkeborg.

Silkeborg
In the summer 2018, 19-year old Alves signed a one-year trainee-contract with Silkeborg which meant, that he was going to train with the first team but play with the U19's. On 26 September 2018, Alves got his official debut for Silkeborg in a Danish Cup game against Næstved BK, where he was among the 11 starting players. On 1 November 2018, he signed a new deal until the end of 2020. Except for the following two games, Alves played all of the remaining games for Silkeborg and helped the team promoting to the Danish Superliga which also gained him a spot on the Danish U-20 national team. On 1 June 2019, Alves signed a new contract until the summer 2024.

West Ham United
On 4 November 2020, Silkeborg announced that they had sold Alves to an unnamed club, believed to be English Premier League club West Ham United. On 22 December 2020, West Ham announced the signing of Alves for an undisclosed fee, on a three-and-a-half year contract commencing on 2 January 2021.

Loan to Sunderland
Alves joined Sunderland on a season-long loan for the 2021–22 EFL League One season on 13 August 2021. He made his Sunderland debut, in the EFL Cup on 24 August, in a 3–2 win against Blackpool. On 14 January 2022, Alves’ loan to Sunderland was cut short and he returned to West Ham United. During his loan period "disciplinary issues" occurred forcing him to be omitted from the team. He also suffered lack of game time as he could not force his way into the team ahead of Callum Doyle, Tom Flanagan and Bailey Wright. He played 10 games in all competitions during his loan at Sunderland.

Brøndby
On 31 January 2022, Alves returned to Denmark, joining Danish champions Brøndby, signing a four-and-a-half year contract with the club. He made his competitive debut coming off the bench in injury time for Mathias Kvistgaarden in a 1–0 league win over his former club Silkeborg.

Style of play
Alves has described his playing style as "a defender who likes to play with the ball at my feet, but I also like defending and am good in my duels", drawing inspiration from German international defender Jérôme Boateng. The Athletic has praised Alves' versatility, owing to his ability to use both feet and being able to operate at right-back. Upon signing for Brøndby, director of football Carsten V. Jensen labelled Alves as "calm on the ball" with "great physical qualities".

Personal life
Alves' mother is Brazilian, while his father is Danish. For this reason, Alves has dual citizenship although he was born and raised in Hvidovre, Denmark.

Career statistics

References

External links

Living people
1999 births
People from Hvidovre Municipality
Association football defenders
Danish men's footballers
Danish people of Brazilian descent
Denmark youth international footballers
Denmark under-21 international footballers
Silkeborg IF players
Danish 1st Division players
Danish Superliga players
West Ham United F.C. players
Danish expatriate men's footballers
Expatriate footballers in England
Sunderland A.F.C. players
Brøndby IF players
Sportspeople from the Capital Region of Denmark